The Nissan Clipper is an automobile nameplate by Nissan that has been used for two separate commercial vehicle ranges of kei trucks in Japan. Originally, this was just a rebadged version of Prince's "Clipper" light/medium duty commercial vehicle range.

In 2003, the nameplate was revived for a rebadged version of the Mitsubishi Minicab, a kei truck/microvan provided in an OEM deal. The Clipper truck/van received its facelift on 2012 and renamed the NT100 Clipper (truck) and NV100 Clipper (van).

In late 2013, the rebadged Minicab models were replaced by a rebadged version of the Suzuki Carry and Every, due to Mitsubishi Motors announced that they would stop manufacturing their own petrol-engined kei trucks and microvans for 2014.

Prince Clipper
This had begun with the AKTG Prince Cabover truck of May 1954, with the Clipper label first introduced on the 1.5-litre AQTI series of October 1958. The Clipper featured a distinct frontal treatment, with six oval openings for cooling. In February 1961, the AQTI was re-engined with the 1.9L GB-4 (later G-2) and renamed BQTI. In 1963 the BQTI was redesigned with quad headlights and renamed T630/T631.

In 1965, the T631 was redesigned with a new body and renamed T65. Following the merger of Nissan and Prince's operations, the truck was renamed T655 in 1967, where it was exclusive to Japanese Nissan dealerships called Nissan Prince Store locations. Again, the front treatment was unusual; the front featured four large chrome-ringed ovals, two of which were for cooling and two held the lights. The T655 also received the 2.0L Nissan H20 four-cylinder petrol engine. In January 1973 the new T40 series replaced the T655, but it was short-lived. The diesel model has chassis codes beginning with YT40. The next (and last) generation Clipper was the C340 of May 1976, but this was merely a rebadged Nissan Caball. The line came to an end in December 1981, when Nissan's commercial truck range was rationalized. The H40 Nissan Atlas replaced both the Clipper and the Caball.

Gallery

Prince Clipper

Rebadged Mitsubishi models

Rebadged Suzuki models

References

Kei cars
Cab over vehicles
Pickup trucks
Clipper
Clipper
Nissan Clipper
Vans
Microvans